Leonel Catán Cubas  (died 22 February 2007 in Santa Ana, El Salvador) was a football player from El Salvador.

Club career
Nicknamed Negro, Cubas has played for Primera División de Fútbol de El Salvador side FAS with whom he won two league titles. He played at FAS alongside his brother Max Catán Cubas, nicknamed Chele.

International career
In February 1961, Cubas made his debut for El Salvador in a friendly match against Colombian club side America Cali. He has earned a total of 5 including unofficial ones. His final international game was a March 1961 CCCF Championship match against Honduras.

Honours
Primera División de Fútbol de El Salvador: 2
 1954, 1958

References

2007 deaths
Salvadoran footballers
El Salvador international footballers
C.D. FAS footballers
Year of birth missing

Association football midfielders
Sportspeople from Santa Ana, El Salvador